Skip Phoenix (born 19 August 1948) is a Canadian diver. He competed in the men's 3 metre springboard event at the 1976 Summer Olympics.

References

1948 births
Living people
Canadian male divers
Olympic divers of Canada
Divers at the 1976 Summer Olympics
Sportspeople from Addis Ababa